Ryan is a populated place in Anna's Hope Village on the island of Saint Croix in United States Virgin Islands.

See also
Castle Nugent National Historic Site
Christiansted National Historic Site
List of islands of the United States Virgin Islands

References

Populated places in Saint Croix, U.S. Virgin Islands
1981 in the United States Virgin Islands